Catharine M. Young (born November 22, 1960) is an American politician. From May 2005 to March 2019, Young represented New York State's 57th district in the New York State Senate. The district includes all of Chautauqua County, Cattaraugus County and Allegany County, as well as seven towns in Livingston County.

Prior to serving as Senator, Young represented New York's 149th State Assembly district from 1999 to 2005.  She is a member of the Republican Party.

Early life and education
A Livingston County native, Young grew up on a farm.  She attended State University of New York at Fredonia, where she met her future husband, Richard. Following a transfer, she graduated magna cum laude with a bachelor's degree in mass communication from St. Bonaventure University.

Early political career
Young was elected to the Cattaraugus County Legislature in 1995.

Young first ran for New York State Assembly in 1998. When veteran Republican New York State Senator Jess Present died in August 1998 and was succeeded by Republican Assemblymember Patricia McGee, McGee's Assembly seat became vacant. Running on the Republican and Conservative Party lines, Young defeated her Democratic opponent, Patrick Tyler, by a margin of 19,337 votes to 12,045 votes. Young served in the Assembly from 1999 to 2005.

New York Senate 
After Sen. Patricia McGee died in office in 2005, Young was nominated to replace her. In a May 2005 special election, Young defeated Democrat Nancy Bargar, 29,559 votes to 12,800 votes.

Rarely facing more than token opposition in subsequent campaigns, Young was unopposed in 2006 and won 78 percent of the vote against 2008 challenger Christopher Schaeffer. Mentioned as a potential candidate in 2010 to run against Eric Massa for New York's 29th congressional district, she stated that although the opportunity was "very tempting," her seat had to be retained in order to help Senate Republicans retake control of the chamber.  According to Young, maintaining her Senate seat would give Upstate New York more of a voice in state government.

Young has chaired the Agriculture Committee and the state’s Rural Resources Commission as well as the Senate Republican Campaign Committee. In 2016, Young was named Chair of the Senate Finance Committee; she was the first woman to hold that position.

After losing 14-9 in a November 2018 attempt to oust incumbent Senate Republican Leader John J. Flanagan and being replaced as chair of the Senate Republican Campaign Committee in December 2018, Young announced on February 28, 2019 that she was resigning from the Senate effective March 10, 2019. Young indicated that she would begin work as Executive Director for the Center of Excellence in Food and Agriculture at Cornell University's AgriTech campus in Geneva, New York on March 11, 2019.

Political positions

Social issues
On December 2, 2009, Young voted against same-sex marriage legislation that failed to pass the Senate. She again voted against allowing same-sex marriage in New York during the senate roll-call vote on the Marriage Equality Act when it came before the Senate on June 24, 2011; the bill narrowly passed nonetheless in a 33-29 vote.

Young voted in favor of the State Senate's version of the Women's Equality Act in June 2013, which did not include the State Assembly's provisions for expanding abortion rights.

Support for areas declared disasters
In 2014, Young was recognized for helping to achieve the award of $700,000 in compensation monies from the Federal Emergency Management Agency (FEMA) for Gowanda, New York as a result of the devastating flood that occurred there in 2009.  In 2009, a flash flood devastated the village, causing two deaths.  Four feet of flood waters swept through the village, and caused much damage.  The village was declared both a state and federal disaster site.

See also
 2009 New York State Senate leadership crisis

References

External links
 New York State Senate: Catharine Young

|-

1960 births
21st-century American politicians
21st-century American women politicians
Living people
Republican Party members of the New York State Assembly
Republican Party New York (state) state senators
People from Livingston County, New York
People from Olean, New York
St. Bonaventure University alumni
Women state legislators in New York (state)